Everything Is Miscellaneous: The Power of the New Digital Disorder is a book by David Weinberger published in 2007. The book's central premise is that there is no universally acceptable way of classifying information. Starting with the story of the Dewey Decimal Classification, Weinberger demonstrates that all attempts to classify inherently reflect the biases of the person defining the classification system.

Notes

External links
  Everything is Miscellaneous Official Site
 

American non-fiction books
2007 non-fiction books
Works about information